

2000

2001

2002

2003

2004

2005

2006

2007

2008

2009

See also
 Informational revolution

References

External links
 A Brief History of Computing, by Stephen White. An excellent computer history site; the present article is a modified version of his timeline, used with permission.

2000
2000s in technology
Computing

pt:Revolução digital